Francia is the kingdom of the Franks. Francia may also refer to:
 Latin name for France (used, for example, in Hungarian, Italian, Spanish, Galician, etc.)
 Francia (river), a river in Castile and León, Spain
 Francia (film), a 2009 Argentina film
 La Francia, coal mine in Colombia owned by the Goldman Sachs Group.
 Francia (Mexico City Metrobús), a BRT station in Mexico City
 Francia metro station, in Valparaíso, Chile
Francia, a ship that was wrecked off the coast of Madagascar in 2021

People 
 Francesco Francia (1447–1517),  Italian artist from Bologna
 José Gaspar Rodríguez de Francia (1766–1840), Paraguayan dictator
 Juan Pablo Francia (born 1984), Argentinian footballer
 Mirka Francia (born 1975), Cuban-Italian volleyball player
 Paolo Francia (1901–????), Italian biathlete
 Peter de Francia (1921–2012), Italian-British artist
 Peter L. Francia (born 1974), American political scientist 
 Francia Jackson (born 1975), Dominican Republic volleyball player